The Platu 25 (formerly Beneteau 25) is a sailing boat designed by Farr Yacht Design led by Bruce Farr with the first boat being built by McDell Marine in New Zealand in the early 1990s. It became a class recognised by the International Sailing Federation in November 2006.

History
The International Platu 25 Class Association was formed as the owners association to support the class and promote racing amongst owners which led to the class becoming an ISAF recognised. This entitled the class to hold World Championships.

The boat current two builders being Beneteau in France and Extreme Sailing Products near Singapore.

Events

World Championships

References

External links

Official
 Official Platu 25 Class Association Website
 ISAF Platu 25 Microsite Website
 ISAF Homepage

Manufactures
 
 

Classes of World Sailing
Keelboats
1990s sailboat type designs
Sailboat types built by Beneteau
Sailboat types built in France
Sailboat types built in New Zealand
Sailing yachts designed by Farr Yacht Design
Sailing yachts designed by Bruce Farr
Beneteau